The Cotter Dam is a concrete gravity and rockfill embankment dam across the Cotter River, located in the Australian Capital Territory, Australia. Both the dam and river are named after early settler in the area Garrett Cotter. The impounded Cotter Reservoir is a supply source of potable water for the city of Canberra and its environs.

Original dam completed in 1915

The original concrete gravity Cotter Dam was started in 1912 and finished by 1915 when the city of Canberra was being established. The uncontrolled spillway was capable of discharging . Additional galleries and drains were constructed between 1984 and 1986. In order to supply the city with potable water, water from the reservoir was pumped to Mount Stromlo, and from there the water flowed by gravity to fill the city's reservoirs.

From the 1960s onwards, better quality water could be supplied without pumping using the newly completed Bendora and Corin dams, and Cotter Dam was only used when water was in short supply. However, in December 2004, ACTEW Corporation brought the dam back on line in response to the ongoing drought.

Enlarged dam completed in 2013

The old dam wall remains, inundated by the water held behind the new dam wall and acting as a sediment trap for the new dam's intake tower. The old dam may only be visible in exceptional circumstances of drought. Completion was originally scheduled for the end of June 2011, however construction was delayed until August 2013 due to heavy rainfalls in the summer of 2010/2011, the discovery of an unexpectedly large rock seam at the site of the foundations in 2011, and severe flooding in March 2012.

Engineering heritage 
The dam precinct received a Historic Engineering Marker from Engineers Australia as part of its Engineering Heritage Recognition Program.

See also

 List of dams and reservoirs in the Australian Capital Territory

References

External links

The Cotter Heritage Story

Bureau of Meteorology, water levels for Cotter Dam

Roller-compacted concrete dams
Dams completed in 1912
Dams in the Australian Capital Territory
Embankment dams
Gravity dams
Rock-filled dams
Dams completed in 2013
Murray-Darling basin
1912 establishments in Australia
Recipients of Engineers Australia engineering heritage markers